The Mercedes-Benz W206 is the fifth generation of the Mercedes-Benz C-Class which is produced by Mercedes-Benz Group AG (formerly known as Daimler AG) since 2021. It replaces the W205 C-Class which has been produced since 2014. The fifth-generation C-Class is available in sedan (W206), station wagon/estate (S206), and long-wheelbase sedan (V206) body styles. The W206 C-Class is based on the Mercedes MRA II rear-wheel drive modular platform also used by the W223 S-Class.

Design
All W206 C-Class models are equipped with four-cylinder engines that have an integrated starter generator (15 kW electric motor) and a 48-volt electrical system. Daimler does not offer the W206 with halogen headlamps.

The W206 has independent front and rear suspension. The front axle is a four-link axle, the rear axle is a multi-link axle. Rear axle steering with a steering angle of 2.5 degrees is available as a factory option; the turning circle is reduced by 0.4 m to 10.6 m with the rear axle steering option. The interior styling is related to the S-Class (W223).

The C-Class All-Terrain was released as the crossover-styled estate model. Bearing the X206 codename, it received external body cladding, a 40 mm increase in ride height, 4Matic AWD and additional drive modes.

Powertrain
The smallest available petrol engine is the 1.5 liter M264 engine offered in the C 180 model (rated power ), and in the C 200 model (rated power ). The C 300 model is powered by a 2.0 liter M254 petrol engine rated . The M254 is equipped with a twin-scroll "segmented" turbocharger featuring an overboost function that allows it to produce an additional 26 kW for up to 30 seconds, as well as a 48V electric supercharger that provides assist at low engine speeds.

Daimler initially offers two Diesel models, the C 220d, and the C 300d. Compared with the preceding Diesel engine, the OM654 has a new crankshaft that increases the stroke to 94.3 millimeters, and a water-cooled, variable turbine geometry turbocharger.

Daimler has announced that it will be offering a plug-in hybrid model with a petrol engine, the C 300e, as well as a plug-in hybrid model with a diesel engine, the C 300de. The "4MATIC" all-wheel drive system will be offered as a factory option on both the C 300e and C 300de types. The plug-in hybrid models are supposed to have an all-electric range of 100 kilometres.

As of April 2022, AMG offers a new engine in the C 43 4MATIC: a turbocharged 2.0 liter 4-cylinder M139  engine + 48V electric motor, rated a combined .

References

External links 

Cars introduced in 2021
Compact executive cars
W206
W206
Plug-in hybrid vehicles
Sedans
Station wagons
Cars powered by longitudinal 4-cylinder engines